The Silver Wolf is the highest award made by The Scout Association "for services of the most exceptional character."  It is an unrestricted gift of the Chief Scout. The award consists of a Silver Wolf suspended from a dark green and yellow neck ribbon.

History
Since its inception by Robert Baden-Powell, the Silver Wolf has remained the "unrestricted gift of the Chief Scout", although "County Commissioners and overseas Chief Scouts may submit recommendations to Scout Headquarters."

During the early years of the development of the Scout Movement throughout the world, it was the practice of the Founder, Lord Baden-Powell, to give the Silver Wolf to Scouters in any country who had done outstandingly valuable work for the Movement. The Silver Wolf was first awarded to King's Scouts or King's Sea Scouts of at least 2 years service and who earned 12 proficiency badges, who performed under exceptional circumstances like saving a life or repeated acts of bravery, endurance, or self-sacrifice. This Silver Wolf remained a Youth award until 1922, when it became an award for Adult volunteers for Services to Scouting.

The award was of course highly valued, but it began to be realized that the Silver Wolf was a British Scout decoration, even though it was given by the Chief Scout of the World.  Accordingly, in 1934, the Bronze Wolf Award was created as the only award made by the World Scout Committee.

Recipients

 John Dawe
 Hazel Adair (novelist)
 Demetrios Alexatos
 Robert Baden-Powell, 1st Baron Baden-Powell
 Vera Barclay
 Daniel Carter Beard
 Edward Wentworth Beatty
 Annie Besant
 Glad Bincham
 Walter von Bonstetten
 John Buchan
 Carol II of Romania
 Mario di Carpegna
 Bernard Chacksfield
 Jean Corbisier
 Donald Deacon
 Juan Antonio Dimas
 Haydn Dimmock
 Rosemary Fletcher MBE
 William Gentry
 Michal Grazynski
 Jacques Guérin-Desjardins
 Gustaf V
 Victor Halward
 Charles Hoadley
 Forbes Howie
 Stanley Ince
 André Lefèvre (Scouting)
 Colin H. Livingstone
 William de Bois Maclaren
 Hubert S. Martin
 Douglas Mawson
 John May (youth worker)
 Roy Morris
 Garth Morrison
 P. B. Nevill
 Louis-Clément Picalausa
 Rudolf Plajner
 Roger Plumb
 Jean Jacques Rambonnet
 Henry Way Rymill
 Jacques Sevin 
 Sano Tsuneha
 Mortimer L. Schiff
 Alec Spalding
 Francis George Stevens
 John Rous, 4th Earl of Stradbroke
 George Turner Waldegrave
 W. F. Waters
 James E. West
 John Frederick Wilkinson
 J. S. Wilson
 Simon C. Yew
 Gail Langton
 Alan Naylor 
 Roderick Lloyd
 Musette Majendie
 Maurice William Lee
 Steve Sudbury

References

 
 
Vera Barclay: A Scouting Pioneer – heritage.scouts.org.uk

Scout and Guide awards
The Scout Association